The following are international rankings of Malaysia.

Cities
2thinknow: Innovation Cities™ Index 2011, Kuala Lumpur ranked 67th in the world
2thinknow: Innovation Cities™ Index 2012, Kuala Lumpur ranked 66th in the world
2thinknow: Innovation Cities™ Index 2014, Kuala Lumpur and Petaling Jaya ranked 98th and 328th in the world respectively
2thinknow: Innovation Cities™ Index 2015, Kuala Lumpur and Petaling Jaya ranked 88th and 306th in the world respectively
2thinknow: Innovation Cities™ Index 2016, Kuala Lumpur and Petaling Jaya ranked 92nd and 331st in the world respectively
2thinknow: Innovation Cities™ Index 2018, Kuala Lumpur and Petaling Jaya ranked 99th and 362nd in the world respectively
2thinknow: Innovation Cities™ Index 2019, Kuala Lumpur and Petaling Jaya ranked 81st and 409th in the world respectively
ADB: Asian Development Outlook 2019 Update Fostering Growth and Inclusion In Asia's Cities, Kuala Lumpur ranked 2nd out of 278 Asian cities for most congested cities
Agoda: Top Summer Destinations By Middle East 2019, Kuala Lumpur ranked top 10 in the world
Arcadis: International Construction Costs 2016, Kuala Lumpur ranked 41st out of 44 global cities
Arcadis: International Construction Costs 2017, Kuala Lumpur ranked 43rd out of 44 global cities
Arcadis: International Construction Costs 2018, Kuala Lumpur ranked 47th out of 50 global cities
Arcadis: International Construction Costs 2019, Kuala Lumpur ranked 97th out of 100 global cities
Arcadis: Sustainable Cities Index 2016, Kuala Lumpur ranked 55th out of 100 global cities
Arcadis: Sustainable Cities Index 2017, Kuala Lumpur ranked 95th out of 100 global cities
Arcadis: Sustainable Cities Index 2018, Kuala Lumpur ranked 67th out of 100 global cities
ASEAN: Clean Tourist City Standard Award 2017, George Town and Muar both granted this award
ASEAN: Clean Tourist City Standard Award 2020, Penang, Putrajaya and Kota Kinabalu all granted this award
A.T. Kearney: Global Cities Index 2012 , Kuala Lumpur ranked 49th out of 66 global cities
A.T. Kearney: Global Cities Index 2014 , Kuala Lumpur ranked 53rd out of 84 global cities
A.T. Kearney: Global Cities Index 2015 , Kuala Lumpur ranked 47th out of 125 global cities
A.T. Kearney: Global Cities Index 2016 , Kuala Lumpur ranked 49th out of 125 global cities
A.T. Kearney: Global Cities Index 2017 , Kuala Lumpur ranked 49th out of 128 global cities
A.T. Kearney: Global Cities Index 2018 , Kuala Lumpur ranked 49th out of 135 global cities
A.T. Kearney: Global Cities Index 2019, Kuala Lumpur ranked 49th out of 130 global cities
A.T. Kearney: Global Cities Outlook 2016 , Kuala Lumpur ranked 54th out of 124 global cities
A.T. Kearney: Global Cities Outlook 2017 , Kuala Lumpur ranked 53rd out of 128 global cities
A.T. Kearney: Global Cities Outlook 2018 , Kuala Lumpur ranked 61st out of 135 global cities
A.T. Kearney: Global Cities Outlook 2019, Kuala Lumpur ranked 76th out of 130 global cities
Big 7 Travel: The 50 Friendliest Cities In The World 2019, Kuala Lumpur ranked 2nd in the world
Boston Consulting Group: Cities of Choice Global City Ranking 2021, Kuala Lumpur ranked 39th out of 45 global cities
Caterwings: Best Food Destinations 2017, George Town ranked 51st out of 100 global cities
CBRE: Global Living Report 2019, Kuala Lumpur ranked 32nd out of 35 global cities
Crescent Rating: Muslim Travel Shopping Index (MTSI) 2015, Kuala Lumpur and Penang ranked 2nd and 11th out of 40 global cities respectively
 Daily Mirror: World's Best City For Street Food 2019, Penang and Kuala Lumpur ranked 17th and 20th out of 30 global cities respectively
 Dell: Women Entrepreneur Cities Index 2017, Kuala Lumpur ranked 41st out of 50 global cities
 Dell: Women Entrepreneur Cities Index 2019, Kuala Lumpur ranked 44th out of 50 global cities
 Cushman & Wakefield: Prepped Cities Index 2018, Kuala Lumpur ranked 8th out of 17 cities in Asia Pacific region
EasyPark Group: Smart Cities Index 2017, Kuala Lumpur ranked 84th out of 500 global cities
EasyPark Group: Smart Cities Index 2019, Kuala Lumpur ranked 94th out of 500 global cities
EasyPark Group: Cities of the Future Index 2022, Kuala Lumpur ranked 50th out of 3,200 global cities for Metropolitan areas with populations over 3 million people
ECA International: Cost of Living Survey 2016, Kuala Lumpur ranked 197th out of 262 global cities
ECA International: Cost of Living Survey 2017, Kuala Lumpur, George Town and Johor Bahru ranked 212th, 245th and 250th out of 262 global cities respectively
ECA International: Cost of Living Survey 2018, Kuala Lumpur ranked 182nd out of 475 global cities
ECA International: Global Liveability Index 2015, George Town, Kuala Lumpur and Johor Bahru ranked 118th, 118th and 126th out of 269 global cities respectively
ECA International: Global Liveability Index 2016, George Town, Kuala Lumpur and Johor Bahru ranked 117th, 120th and 127th out of 269 global cities respectively
ECA International: Global Liveability Index 2017, George Town, Kuala Lumpur and Johor Bahru ranked 115th, 118th and 128th out of 269 global cities respectively
ECA International: Global Liveability Index 2018, George Town and Kuala Lumpur ranked 120th and 126th out of 480 global cities respectively
ECA International: Global Liveability Index 2019, George Town and Kuala Lumpur ranked 97th and 98th out of 480 global cities respectively
Economist Intelligence Unit: Global Liveability Ranking 2015, Kuala Lumpur ranked 73rd out of 140 global cities
Economist Intelligence Unit: Global Liveability Ranking 2017, Kuala Lumpur ranked 70th out of 140 global cities
Economist Intelligence Unit: Safe Cities Index 2017, Kuala Lumpur ranked 31st out of 60 global cities
Economist Intelligence Unit: Safe Cities Index 2019, Kuala Lumpur ranked 35th out of 60 global cities
Economist Intelligence Unit: Safe Cities Index 2021, Kuala Lumpur ranked 32nd out of 60 global cities
Economist Intelligence Unit: Worldwide Cost of Living Report 2015, Kuala Lumpur ranked 81st out of 133 global cities
Economist Intelligence Unit: Worldwide Cost of Living Report 2016, Kuala Lumpur ranked 100th out of 133 global cities
Economist Intelligence Unit: Worldwide Cost of Living Report 2017, Kuala Lumpur ranked 96th out of 133 global cities
Economist Intelligence Unit: Worldwide Cost of Living Report 2018, Kuala Lumpur ranked 98th out of 133 global cities
Economist Intelligence Unit: Worldwide Cost of Living Report 2019, Kuala Lumpur ranked 88th out of 133 global cities
EF English Proficiency Index 2019, Kuala Lumpur ranked 19th out of 94 global cities
Euromonitor International: Top 100 City Destinations Ranking WTM London 2017 Edition, Kuala Lumpur, Johor Bahru and Penang ranked 10th, 42nd and 63rd in the world
Expatistan Cost of Living Index 2018, Kuala Lumpur and George Town ranked 258th and 304th out of 343 global cities respectively
Findexable: Asia Pacific Fintech Rankings 2022, Kuala Lumpur ranked 15th out of 45 Asia Pacific Fintech hubs
Foreign Policy: The Global Cities Index 2010, Kuala Lumpur ranked 48th out of 65 global cities
Foreign Policy: The Global Cities Index 2012, Kuala Lumpur ranked 49th out of 66 global cities
Foreign Policy: The Global Cities Index 2014, Kuala Lumpur ranked 53rd out of 84 global cities
Globalization and World Cities Research Network: The World According to GaWC 2016, Kuala Lumpur and Johor Bahru ranked as Alpha rank and High Sufficiency rank respectively
GoCompare: Best Cities For Millennials To Start Businesses, Kuala Lumpur ranked 30th out of 45 global cities
Hiyacar: World’s Most Stressful Cities To Drive In 2021, Kuala Lumpur ranked 6th out of 36 global cities
Hoopa Top 50 Instagram Destination 2015, Kuala Lumpur ranked 29th out of 50 global cities
Hoopa Most Liked Instagram Destinations In The World 2015, Kuala Lumpur ranked 18th out of 25 global cities
Hoopa Top 50 Instagram Destination 2019, Kuala Lumpur ranked 39th out of 50 global cities
IESE: Cities in Motion Index (CIMI) 2014, Kuala Lumpur ranked 56th out of 135 global cities
IESE: Cities in Motion Index (CIMI) 2015, Kuala Lumpur ranked 88th out of 148 global cities
IESE: Cities in Motion Index (CIMI) 2016, Kuala Lumpur ranked 88th out of 181 global cities
IESE: Cities in Motion Index (CIMI) 2017, Kuala Lumpur ranked 92nd out of 180 global cities
IESE: Cities in Motion Index (CIMI) 2018, Kuala Lumpur ranked 87th out of 165 global cities
IESE: Cities in Motion Index (CIMI) 2019, Kuala Lumpur ranked 100th out of 174 global cities
IMD: Smart City Index 2019, ranked 70th out of 102 global cities
IMD: Smart City Index 2020, ranked 54th out of 109 global cities
IMD: Smart City Index 2021, ranked 74th out of 118 global cities
International Living 15 Best Islands in the World to Retire On 2021, Penang ranked 3rd in the world
InterNations: Expat City Ranking 2017, Kuala Lumpur ranked 4th out of 51 global cities
InterNations: Expat City Ranking 2018, Kuala Lumpur ranked 6th out of 62 global cities
InterNations: Expat City Ranking 2019, Kuala Lumpur ranked 2nd out of 82 global cities
InterNations: Expat City Ranking 2020, Kuala Lumpur ranked 8th out of 56 global cities
InterNations: Expat City Ranking 2021, Kuala Lumpur ranked 1st out of 57 global cities
Julius Baer: Wealth Report Asia 2018, ranked 11th out of 11 Asia cities
Knight Frank: Asia Pacific Prime Office Rental Index Q1 2017, Kuala Lumpur ranked 20th out of 20 Asian cities
Knight Frank: Global Residential Cities Index Q4 2016, Kuala Lumpur ranked 79th out of 150 global cities
Knight Frank: Prime International Residential Index (PIRI) 2017, Kuala Lumpur ranked 80th out of 100 global cities
Knight Frank: The Knight Frank City Wealth Index 2017, Kuala Lumpur ranked 31st out of 40 global cities
KPMG: Leading Technology Innovation Hub 2021, Kuala Lumpur ranked 9th in ASPAC region
Lloyd's List: Top 100 Ports 2016, Port Klang, Port Tanjung Pelepas and Penang ranked 12th, 18th and 98th in the world respectively
Lloyd's List: Top 100 Ports 2017, Port Klang, Port Tanjung Pelepas and Penang ranked 11th, 19th and 99th in the world respectively
Lloyd's List: Top 100 Ports 2018, Port Klang and Port Tanjung Pelepas ranked 12nd and 19th in the world respectively
Lloyd's List: Top 100 Ports 2019, Port Klang and Port Tanjung Pelepas ranked 12nd and 18th in the world respectively
Lloyd's List: Top 100 Ports 2020, Port Klang and Port Tanjung Pelepas ranked 12nd and 18th in the world respectively
Lonely Planet: Top 10 Cities list for Best in Travel 2016, George Town ranked 4th in the world
Love2Laundry: Top 10 Least Stressful Cities 2021, Kuala Lumpur ranked 10th out of 50 global cities
Lyon Cab Transfer Shuttle : Taxi service transportation 2016, Kuala Lumpur ranked 2nd cheap taxi, limo service transport fares in Asia region
MasterCard: Global Destination Cities Index 2015, Kuala Lumpur ranked 7th in the world
MasterCard: Global Destination Cities Index 2016, Kuala Lumpur ranked 7th in the world
MasterCard: Global Destination Cities Index 2017, Kuala Lumpur ranked 8th in the world
MasterCard: Global Destination Cities Index 2018 , Kuala Lumpur ranked 7th in the world
MasterCard: Global Destination Cities Index 2019, Kuala Lumpur ranked 6th in the world
Mercer: Cost of Living Rankings 2016, Kuala Lumpur ranked 151st out of 209 global cities
Mercer: Cost of Living Rankings 2018, Kuala Lumpur ranked 145th out of 209 global cities
Mercer: Cost of Living Rankings 2019, Kuala Lumpur ranked 141st out of 209 global cities
Mercer: Cost of Living Rankings 2020, Kuala Lumpur ranked 144th out of 209 global cities
Mercer: Cost of Living Rankings 2021, Kuala Lumpur ranked 152nd out of 209 global cities
Mercer: Quality of Living Rankings 2016, Kuala Lumpur ranked 86th out of 230 global cities
Mercer: Quality of Living Rankings 2017, Kuala Lumpur and Johor Bahru ranked 86th and 103rd out of 231 global cities respectively
Mercer: Quality of Living Rankings 2018, Kuala Lumpur and Johor Bahru ranked 85th and 101st out of 231 global cities respectively
Mercer: Quality of Living Rankings 2019, Kuala Lumpur and Johor Bahru ranked 85th and 101st out of 231 global cities respectively
Nestpick: Millennial Cities Ranking 2017, Kuala Lumpur ranked 62nd out of 100 global cities
Nestpick: Millennial Cities Ranking 2018, Kuala Lumpur ranked 53rd out of 110 global cities
Nestpick: Generation Z City Index 2019, Kuala Lumpur ranked 95th out of 110 global cities
New Seven Wonders Foundation: New7Wonders Cities 2014, Kuala Lumpur selected as one of the New7Wonders Cities in the world
OAG: Megahubs International Index 2018, Kuala Lumpur ranked 1st in the world for most internationally connected low-cost carrier megahub
OAG: Megahubs International Index 2019, Kuala Lumpur ranked 12th out of 50 global cities and ranked 1st in the world for most internationally connected low-cost carrier megahub
Open For Business City Rankings 2018, Kuala Lumpur ranked C for City is partially open for business
Open For Business City Rankings 2020, Kuala Lumpur ranked CC for City is partially inclusive and competitive
PricewaterhouseCoopers: Cities of Opportunity 2014, Kuala Lumpur ranked 17th out of 30 global cities
PricewaterhouseCoopers: Cities of Opportunity 2016, Kuala Lumpur ranked 20th out of 30 global cities
Startup Genome: Top 100 Emerging Ecosystem Ranking - The Global Startup Ecosystem Report 2020 (GSER 2020), Kuala Lumpur ranked ranked 11st out of 270 ecosystems from over 100 countries.
Startup Genome: Top 100 Emerging Ecosystem Ranking - The Global Startup Ecosystem Report 2021 (GSER 2021), Kuala Lumpur ranked ranked 21st out of 300 ecosystems from over 100 countries.
Sustainable Destinations Top 100 2018 , Taiping is ranked top 100 sustainable cities in the world
Sustainable Destinations Top 100 2019, Taiping is ranked 3rd sustainable cities in the world
Taxi2Airport: Cost of Public Transportation In 53 countries 2019, Kuala Lumpur ranked cheapest public transport fares in South East Asia region
The CEO Magazine: Cities for the Best Work–Life Balance 2019, Kuala Lumpur ranked 40th out of 40 global cities
Time: The Selfiest Cities in the World 2014, Petaling Jaya and George Town are ranked 5th and 10th out of 100 cities respectively
Time Out: The 48 best cities in the world in 2019, Kuala Lumpur is ranked 46th out of 48 cities
ValueChampion: Top Millennial-Friendly Cities in Asia-Pacific, Kuala Lumpur ranked 14th out of 20 global cities
Quacquarelli Symonds: Best Student Cities 2014, Kuala Lumpur ranked 43rd out of 50 global cities
Quacquarelli Symonds: Best Student Cities 2016, Kuala Lumpur ranked 53rd out of 74 global cities
Quacquarelli Symonds: Best Student Cities 2017, Kuala Lumpur ranked 41st out of 100 global cities
Quacquarelli Symonds: Best Student Cities 2018, Kuala Lumpur ranked 37th out of 100 global cities
Quacquarelli Symonds: Best Student Cities 2019, Kuala Lumpur ranked 29th out of 100 global cities
Quacquarelli Symonds: Best Student Cities 2022, Kuala Lumpur ranked 31st out of 115 global cities
Quacquarelli Symonds: Most Affordable Cities For Students 2017, Kuala Lumpur ranked 1st in the world
Quacquarelli Symonds: Most Affordable Cities For Students 2018, Kuala Lumpur ranked 2nd in the world
Quacquarelli Symonds: Most Affordable Cities For Students 2019, Kuala Lumpur ranked 2nd in the world
World Shipping Council: Top 50 World Container Ports 2019 , Port Klang and Port Tanjung Pelepas ranked 12th and 18th in the world respectively
YCP Solidiance: Top E-commerce Cities in Asia 2019, Kuala Lumpur ranked top 12 in 40 Asian countries

States
 Condé Nast Traveler The 10 Best Places in the World to Retire 2016, Penang ranked 2nd in the world
CNN: 17 Best Places To Visit In 2017, Penang ranked 2nd in the world
CNN: 19 Best Spring Travel Destinations 2019, Penang ranked top 19 destinations in the world
CNN: 17 Best Places To Visit For The Ultimate Asia Experience 2019, Penang ranked top 17 destinations in Asia
CNN: 21 Best Destinations To Go 2022, Penang ranked top 21 destinations in the world
Money.com : 10 Amazing Asian Vacations That Won't Cost a Fortune Penang, Malaysia, ranked #10

Economic
 Asian Corporate Governance Association (ACGA): Corporate Governance (CG) Watch Report 2018, ranked 4th out of 12 Asian countries in terms of market accountability and transparency 
 Basel Institute on Governance: Basel AML Index 2020, ranked 65th out of 141 countries
 Boao Forum for Asia: Asian Competitiveness Annual Report 2014, ranked 11th out of 37 countries
 Boao Forum for Asia: Asian Competitiveness Annual Report 2015, ranked 11th out of 37 countries
 Boao Forum for Asia: Asian Competitiveness Annual Report 2016, ranked 13th out of 37 countries
 Boao Forum for Asia: Asian Competitiveness Annual Report 2017, ranked 13th out of 37 countries
 Boao Forum for Asia: Asian Competitiveness Annual Report 2018, ranked 11th out of 37 countries
 Centre for Economics and Business Research (CEBR): World Economic League Table 2003 , ranked 39th out of 190 countries
 Centre for Economics and Business Research (CEBR): World Economic League Table 2008 , ranked 40th out of 192 countries
 Centre for Economics and Business Research (CEBR): World Economic League Table 2013 , ranked 35th out of 193 countries
 Centre for Economics and Business Research (CEBR): World Economic League Table 2018 , ranked 37th out of 193 countries
 Centre for Economics and Business Research (CEBR): World Economic League Table 2019 , ranked 35th out of 193 countries
 Centre for Economics and Business Research (CEBR): World Economic League Table 2020 , ranked 40th out of 193 countries
 Centre for Economics and Business Research (CEBR): World Economic League Table 2021 , ranked 34th out of 193 countries
 Centre for Economics and Business Research (CEBR): World Economic League Table 2022 , ranked 37th out of 191 countries
 CEOWORLD Magazine: World’s Best Countries To Invest In Or Do Business For 2019, ranked 1st out of 67 countries
 CIA World Factbook: GDP - official exchange rate (2014), ranked 36th out of 218 countries
 CIA World Factbook: GDP - per capita (PPP) (2013), ranked 70th out of 181 countries
 CIA World Factbook: Budget Expenditures (2014), ranked 43rd out of 224 countries
 CIA World Factbook: Budget revenues (2014), ranked 46th out of 226 countries
 CIA World Factbook: Budget surplus (+) or deficit (-) % of GDP (2014), ranked 155th out of 213 countries
 CIA World Factbook: Current account balance (2014), ranked 19th out of 193 countries
 CIA World Factbook: Debt - external (2014), ranked 49th out of 201 countries
 CIA World Factbook: Exports (2014), ranked 25th out of 223 countries
 CIA World Factbook: Household income or consumption by percentage share - highest 10% (2014), ranked 46th out of 147 countries
 CIA World Factbook: Household income or consumption by percentage share - lowest 10% (2014), ranked 115th out of 147 countries
 CIA World Factbook: Inflation rate (consumer prices) (%) (2014), ranked 190th out of 227 countries
 CIA World Factbook: Labor force (2014), ranked 42nd out of 232 countries
 CIA World Factbook: Labor force - by occupation - agriculture (%) (2014), ranked 117th out of 197 countries
 CIA World Factbook: Labor force - by occupation - industry (%) (2014), ranked 36th out of 167 countries
 CIA World Factbook: Labor force - by occupation - services (%) (2014), ranked 106th out of 194 countries
 DHL: Global Connectedness Index 2012, ranked 16th out of 140 countries
 DHL: Global Connectedness Index 2014, ranked 21st out of 140 countries
 DHL: Global Connectedness Index 2016, ranked 19th out of 140 countries
 DHL: Global Connectedness Index 2018, ranked 12th out of 169 countries
Findexable: Global Fintech Rankings 2021, ranked 46th out of 83 countries
 Foreign Policy: Baseline Profitability Index 2015, ranked 6th out of 110 countries
 Forbes: Best Countries for Business 2018, ranked 35th out of 153 countries
 Forbes: Best Countries for Business 2019, ranked 35th out of 161 countries
 Fraser Institute: Economic Freedom of the World 2010, ranked 70th out of 153 countries
 Fraser Institute: Economic Freedom of the World 2011, ranked 72nd out of 153 countries
 Fraser Institute: Economic Freedom of the World 2012, ranked 72nd out of 153 countries
 Fraser Institute: Economic Freedom of the World 2013, ranked 56th out of 157 countries
 Fraser Institute: Economic Freedom of the World 2014, ranked 62nd out of 159 countries
 Fraser Institute: Economic Freedom of the World 2015, ranked 65th out of 159 countries
 Global Entrepreneurship and Development Institute: Global Entrepreneurship Index 2019, ranked 58th out of 137 countries
 Heritage Foundation: Index of Economic Freedom 2006 , ranked 68th out of 157 countries
 Heritage Foundation: Index of Economic Freedom 2008, ranked 51st out of 157 countries
 Heritage Foundation: Index of Economic Freedom 2009, ranked 58th out of 179 countries
 Heritage Foundation: Index of Economic Freedom 2010, ranked 59th out of 179 countries
 Heritage Foundation: Index of Economic Freedom 2011, ranked 53rd out of 179 countries
 Heritage Foundation: Index of Economic Freedom 2012, ranked 53rd out of 179 countries
 Heritage Foundation: Index of Economic Freedom 2013, ranked 56th out of 177 countries
 Heritage Foundation: Index of Economic Freedom 2014, ranked 37th out of 178 countries
 Heritage Foundation: Index of Economic Freedom 2015, ranked 31st out of 178 countries
 Heritage Foundation: Index of Economic Freedom 2016, ranked 29th out of 178 countries
 Heritage Foundation: Index of Economic Freedom 2017, ranked 27th out of 180 countries
 Heritage Foundation: Index of Economic Freedom 2018, ranked 22nd out of 180 countries
 IMD:  World Competitiveness Ranking 2010, ranked 10th out of 58 countries
 IMD: World Competitiveness Ranking 2016, ranked 19th out of 58 countries
 IMD: World Competitiveness Ranking 2017, ranked 24th out of 63 countries
 IMD: World Competitiveness Ranking 2018, ranked 22nd out of 63 countries
 IMD: World Competitiveness Ranking 2019, ranked 22nd out of 63 countries
 IMD: World Competitiveness Ranking 2020, ranked 27th out of 64 countries
 IMD: World Competitiveness Ranking 2021, ranked 25th out of 64 countries
 IMD: World Digital Competitiveness Ranking 2016, ranked 24th out of 61 countries
 IMD: World Digital Competitiveness Ranking 2017, ranked 24th out of 63 countries
 IMD: World Digital Competitiveness Ranking 2018, ranked 27th out of 63 countries
 IMD: World Digital Competitiveness Ranking 2019, ranked 26th out of 63 countries
 IMD: World Digital Competitiveness Ranking 2020, ranked 26th out of 63 countries
 International Monetary Fund: GDP (nominal) per capita (2006), ranked 64th out of 182 countries
 International Monetary Fund: GDP (nominal) per capita (2009), ranked 67th out of 180 countries
 International Monetary Fund: GDP (nominal) (2006), ranked 39th out of 181 countries
 International Monetary Fund: GDP (nominal) (2006), ranked 41st out of 181 countries
 Milken Institute: Global Opportunity Index 2022, ranked 1st investment destination for foreign investors in emerging ASEAN countries
 Refinitiv: Islamic Finance Development Indicator (IFDI) 2021, ranked 1st out of 135 countries
 Standard Chartered: Wealth Expectancy Report 2019, ranked 2nd out of 10 countries in terms of smallest wealth expectancy gaps, with around two-thirds of wealth (67 per cents) creators set to achieve more than half of their wealth aspiration.
 Steve Hanke: Misery Index 2013, ranked 103rd out of 109 countries
 Steve Hanke: Misery Index 2014, ranked 101st out of 108 countries
 Steve Hanke: Misery Index 2015, ranked 52nd out of 60 countries
 Steve Hanke: Misery Index 2017, ranked 107th out of 126 countries
 Steve Hanke: Misery Index 2018, ranked 86th out of 95 countries
 The Conference Board: Consumer Confidence Index (CCI) 2018, ranked 7th in the world
 The Economist: Crony Capitalism Index 2016, ranked 2nd out of 22 countries
 The Economist: Crony Capitalism Index 2022, ranked 2nd out of 22 countries
 TMF Group: Compliance Complexity Index 2018, ranked 5th in the world
 TMF Group: Global Business Complexity Index 2019, ranked 27th in the world
 World Bank: Doing Business Report 2011, ranked 21st out of 183 countries
 World Bank: Doing Business Report 2016, ranked 18th out of 190 countries
 World Bank: Doing Business Report 2017, ranked 23rd out of 190 countries
 World Bank: Doing Business Report 2018, ranked 24th out of 190 countries
 World Bank: Doing Business Report 2019, ranked 15th out of 190 countries
 World Bank: Doing Business Report 2020, ranked 12th out of 190 countries
 World Bank: LPI Global Rankings 2016, ranked 32nd out of 160 countries
 World Economic Forum: Global Competitiveness Index 2010, ranked 26th out of 139 countries
 World Economic Forum: Global Competitiveness Index 2015, ranked 18th out of 140 countries
 World Economic Forum: Global Competitiveness Index 2016, ranked 25th out of 138 countries
 World Economic Forum: Global Competitiveness Index 2017, ranked 23rd out of 137 countries
 World Economic Forum: Global Competitiveness Index 2018, ranked 25th out of 140 countries
 World Economic Forum: Global Competitiveness Index 2019, ranked 27th out of 141 countries
 World Economic Forum: Global Enabling Trade Report 2008, ranked 29th out of 118 countries
 World Economic Forum: Global Enabling Trade Report 2009, ranked 28th out of 121 countries
 World Economic Forum: Global Enabling Trade Report 2010, ranked 30th out of 125 countries
 World Economic Forum: Global Enabling Trade Report 2014, ranked 25th out of 138 countries
 World Economic Forum: Global Enabling Trade Report 2016, ranked 37th out of 136 countries

Educational
Coursera Global Skills Index (GSI) 2019, ranked 46th, 47th and 42nd out of 60 countries in Business, Technology and Data Science fields respectively
EF English Proficiency Index 2011, ranked 9th out of 44 countries
EF English Proficiency Index 2012, ranked 13th out of 52 countries
EF English Proficiency Index 2013, ranked 11th out of 60 countries
EF English Proficiency Index 2014, ranked 12th out of 63 countries
EF English Proficiency Index 2015, ranked 14th out of 70 countries
EF English Proficiency Index 2016, ranked 12th out of 72 countries
EF English Proficiency Index 2017, ranked 13th out of 80 countries
EF English Proficiency Index 2018, ranked 22nd out of 88 countries
EF English Proficiency Index 2019, ranked 26th out of 100 countries
EF English Proficiency Index 2020, ranked 30th out of 100 countries
EF English Proficiency Index 2021, ranked 28th out of 112 countries
HSBC Expat Explorer Survey 2015, ranked 20th out of 38 countries
HSBC Expat Explorer Survey 2016, ranked 28th out of 45 countries
HSBC Expat Explorer Survey 2017, ranked 25th out of 46 countries
HSBC Expat Explorer Survey 2018, ranked 14th out of 29 countries
HSBC Expat Explorer Survey 2019, ranked 16th out of 33 countries
HSBC Expat Explorer Survey 2020, ranked 16th out of 40 countries
IMD World Talent Report 2014, ranked 5th out of 60 countries
IMD World Talent Ranking 2015, ranked 15th out of 61 countries
IMD World Talent Ranking 2016, ranked 19th out of 61 countries
IMD World Talent Ranking 2017, ranked 28th out of 63 countries
IMD World Talent Ranking 2018, ranked 22nd out of 63 countries
IMD World Talent Ranking 2019, ranked 22nd out of 63 countries
IMD World Talent Ranking 2020, ranked 25th out of 63 countries
IMD World Talent Ranking 2021, ranked 28th out of 64 countries
InterNations: Expat Insider 2021, ranked 4th out of 59 countries
INSEAD Global Talent Competitiveness Index 2013, ranked 37th out of 103 countries
INSEAD Global Talent Competitiveness Index 2014, ranked 35th out of 93 countries
INSEAD Global Talent Competitiveness Index 2015, ranked 30th out of 109 countries
INSEAD Global Talent Competitiveness Index 2017, ranked 28th out of 118 countries
INSEAD Global Talent Competitiveness Index 2018, ranked 27th out of 119 countries
INSEAD Global Talent Competitiveness Index 2019, ranked 27th out of 125 countries
INSEAD Global Talent Competitiveness Index 2020, ranked 26th out of 132 countries
INSEAD Global Talent Competitiveness Index 2021, ranked 34th out of 134 countries
MasterCard: Financial Literacy Index 2014, ranked 5th out of 16 Asia Pacific countries.
MasterCard: Financial Literacy Index 2015, ranked 6th out of 17 Asia Pacific countries.
OECD: Programme for International Student Assessment 2009, ranked 57th, 53rd and 55th out of 74 countries in mathematics, science and reading respectively. 
OECD: Programme for International Student Assessment 2012, ranked 52nd, 53rd and 59th out of 65 countries in mathematics, science and reading respectively. 
OECD: Programme for International Student Assessment 2015, ranked 44th, 46th and 49th out of 72 countries in mathematics, science and reading respectively. 
Universitas 21: U21 Ranking of National Higher Education Systems 2012, ranked 36th out of 50 countries
Universitas 21: U21 Ranking of National Higher Education Systems 2014, ranked 28th out of 50 countries
Universitas 21: U21 Ranking of National Higher Education Systems 2016, ranked 27th out of 50 countries
Universitas 21: U21 Ranking of National Higher Education Systems 2017, ranked 25th out of 50 countries
Universitas 21: U21 Ranking of National Higher Education Systems 2018, ranked 26th out of 50 countries
Universitas 21: U21 Ranking of National Higher Education Systems 2019, ranked 28th out of 50 countries
Universitas 21: U21 Ranking of National Higher Education Systems 2020, ranked 27th out of 50 countries
Quacquarelli Symonds: Higher Education System Strength Rankings 2016, ranked 27th out of 50 countries
Quacquarelli Symonds: Higher Education System Strength Rankings 2018, ranked 25th out of 50 countries
Save the Children: State of the World's Mothers report 2006, ranked 52nd out of 110 countries
UNESCO: Top 20 Countries For International Students 2014, ranked 12th in the world

Environmental
Value Champion: Asia Pacific Greenest Countries 2019, ranked 8th out of 13 Asia Pacific countries
MIT Technology Review: The Blue Technology Barometer 2022, ranked 44th out of 66 countries
Yale University: Environmental Sustainability Index 2005, ranked 38th out of 146 countries
Yale University: Environmental Performance Index 2006, ranked 9th out of 133 countries
Yale University: Environmental Performance Index 2010, ranked 54th out of 163 countries
Yale University: Environmental Performance Index 2012, ranked 25th out of 132 countries
Yale University: Environmental Performance Index 2018, ranked 75th out of 180 countries

General
 Agility Emerging Markets Logistics Index 2016, ranked 4th out of 45 countries
 Arcadis: Global Infrastructure Investment Index (GIII) 2012, ranked 7th out of 41 countries
 Arcadis: Global Infrastructure Investment Index (GIII) 2014, ranked 7th out of 41 countries
 Arcadis: Global Infrastructure Investment Index (GIII) 2016, ranked 5th out of 41 countries
 Arcadis: International Construction Costs 2015, Malaysia ranked 38th out of 42 countries
 A.T. Kearney / Foreign Policy Magazine: Globalization Index 2006, ranked 19th out of 62 countries
 A.T. Kearney Global Services Location Index (GSLI) 2011, ranked 3rd out of 50 countries
 A.T. Kearney Global Services Location Index (GSLI) 2014, ranked 3rd out of 50 countries
 A.T. Kearney Global Services Location Index (GSLI) 2016, ranked 3rd out of 50 countries
 A.T. Kearney Global Services Location Index (GSLI) 2017, ranked 3rd out of 55 countries
 A.T. Kearney Global Services Location Index (GSLI) 2019, ranked 3rd out of 50 countries
 A.T. Kearney Global Services Location Index (GSLI) 2021, ranked 3rd out of 60 countries
 Bloomberg Innovation Index 2015, ranked 27th out of 50 countries
 Bloomberg Innovation Index 2019, ranked 26th out of 60 countries
 Bloomberg Innovation Index 2020, ranked 27th out of 60 countries
 Bloomberg Innovation Index 2021, ranked 29th out of 60 countries
 Credit Suisse Research Institute (CSRI): The CS Family 1000 Report 2017, ranked 7th in the world for family-owned companies
 EY Capital Confidence Barometer 2015, ranked 5th in the world for investment destinations
 EY Capital Confidence Barometer 2016, ranked 5th in the world for South East Asia region
 ETH Zurich: KOF Index of Globalisation 2012, ranked 29th out of 208 countries
 ETH Zurich: KOF Index of Globalisation 2013, ranked 27th out of 207 countries
 ETH Zurich: KOF Index of Globalisation 2014, ranked 24th out of 207 countries
 ETH Zurich: KOF Index of Globalisation 2015, ranked 26th out of 207 countries
 ETH Zurich: KOF Index of Globalisation 2016, ranked 25th out of 207 countries
 ETH Zurich: KOF Index of Globalisation 2017, ranked 31st out of 207 countries
 ETH Zurich: KOF Index of Globalisation 2018, ranked 28th out of 209 countries
 ETH Zurich: KOF Index of Globalisation 2019, ranked 26th out of 203 countries
 GoBankingRates: 50 Cheapest Countries To Retire To 2021, ranked 1st out of 50 countries
 Henley & Partners Passport Index 2013, ranked 14th out of 103 passport ranks
 Henley & Partners Passport Index 2014, ranked 8th out of 94 passport ranks
 Henley & Partners Passport Index 2015, ranked 9th out of 106 passport ranks
 Henley & Partners Passport Index 2016, ranked 12th out of 104 passport ranks
 Henley & Partners Passport Index 2017 , ranked 13rd out of 104 passport ranks
 Henley & Partners Passport Index 2018, ranked 10th out of 106 passport ranks
 Henley & Partners Passport Index 2019, ranked 13rd out of 108 passport ranks
 Henley & Partners Passport Index 2020, ranked 13rd out of 107 passport ranks
 Henley & Partners Passport Index 2021, ranked 13rd out of 116 passport ranks
 Henley & Partners Passport Index 2022, ranked 12th out of 111 passport ranks
 INSEAD: Global Innovation Index 2007, ranked 26th out of 107 countries
 INSEAD & CII: Global Innovation Index 2008, ranked 25th out of 130 countries
 INSEAD & CII: Global Innovation Index 2009, ranked 28th out of 132 countries
 INSEAD: Global Innovation Index 2011, ranked 31st out of 125 countries
 INSEAD & WIPO: Global Innovation Index 2012, ranked 32nd out of 141 countries
 INSEAD, Cornell University & WIPO: Global Innovation Index 2013, ranked 32nd out of 142 countries
 INSEAD, Cornell University & WIPO: Global Innovation Index 2014, ranked 33rd out of 143 countries
 INSEAD, Cornell University & WIPO: Global Innovation Index 2015, ranked 32nd out of 141 countries
 INSEAD, Cornell University & WIPO: Global Innovation Index 2016, ranked 35th out of 128 countries
 INSEAD, Cornell University & WIPO: Global Innovation Index 2017, ranked 37th out of 127 countries
 INSEAD, Cornell University & WIPO: Global Innovation Index 2018, ranked 35th out of 126 countries
 INSEAD, Cornell University & WIPO: Global Innovation Index 2019, ranked 35th out of 129 countries
 INSEAD, Cornell University & WIPO: Global Innovation Index 2020, ranked 33rd out of 131 countries
 INSEAD, Cornell University & WIPO: Global Innovation Index 2021, ranked 36th out of 132 countries
 WIPO: Global Innovation Index 2021, ranked 36th out of 132 countries
 International Living The World's Best Places To Retire In 2017 / Annual Global Retirement Index 2017, ranked 6th out of 24 countries
 International Living The World's Best Places To Retire In 2018 / Annual Global Retirement Index 2018, ranked 5th out of 24 countries
 International Living The World's Best Places To Retire In 2019 / Annual Global Retirement Index 2019, ranked 5th out of 15 countries
 International Living The World's Best Places To Retire In 2022 / Annual Global Retirement Index 2022, ranked 15th out of 25 countries
Knight Frank: Global House Price Index Q4 2016 ranked 27th out of 55 countries
 Legatum Prosperity Index 2010, ranked 43rd out of 110 countries
 Legatum Prosperity Index 2011 , ranked 43rd out of 110 countries
 Legatum Prosperity Index 2012, ranked 45th out of 142 countries
 Legatum Prosperity Index 2013, ranked 44th out of 142 countries
 Legatum Prosperity Index 2014, ranked 45th out of 142 countries
 Legatum Prosperity Index 2015, ranked 44th out of 142 countries
 Legatum Prosperity Index 2016, ranked 38th out of 149 countries
 Legatum Prosperity Index 2017, ranked 42nd out of 149 countries
 Legatum Prosperity Index 2018, ranked 44th out of 149 countries
 Legatum Prosperity Index 2019, ranked 41st out of 167 countries
 LinkedIn Opportunity Index 2018, ranked 5th out of 9 countries
 LinkedIn Opportunity Index 2020, ranked 9th out of 22 countries
 MasterCard-Crescent Rating: Global Muslim Travel Index (GMTI) 2015, ranked 1st out of 100 countries
 MasterCard-Crescent Rating: Global Muslim Travel Index (GMTI) 2016, ranked 1st out of 130 countries
 MasterCard-Crescent Rating: Global Muslim Travel Index (GMTI) 2017, ranked 1st out of 130 countries
 MasterCard-Crescent Rating: Global Muslim Travel Index (GMTI) 2018, ranked 1st out of 130 countries
 MasterCard-Crescent Rating: Global Muslim Travel Index (GMTI) 2019, ranked 1st out of 129 countries
 MasterCard-Crescent Rating: Global Muslim Travel Index (GMTI) 2021, ranked 1st out of 140 countries
 MasterCard Index of Women Entrepreneurs (MIWE) 2017, ranked 28th out of 56 countries
 MasterCard Index of Women Entrepreneurs (MIWE) 2018, ranked 24th out of 58 countries
 MasterCard Index of Women Entrepreneurs (MIWE) 2019, ranked 21st out of 58 countries
Newsweek World's Best Countries 2010 , ranked 37th out of 100 countries
 Passport Index 2016, ranked 6th out of 98 passport power ranks
 Passport Index 2017, ranked 4th out of 93 passport power ranks
 Passport Index 2018, ranked 6th out of 96 passport power ranks
 Passport Index 2020, ranked 8th out of 90 passport power ranks
 United Nations: Human Development Index 2006, ranked 61st out of 177 countries
 United Nations: Human Development Index 2007/2008, ranked 63rd out of 177 countries
 United Nations: Human Development Index 2009, ranked 66th out of 182 countries
 United Nations: Human Development Index 2015, ranked 62nd out of 188 countries
 United Nations: Human Development Index 2016, ranked 59th out of 188 countries
 United Nations: Human Development Index 2017 , ranked 57th out of 189 countries
 United Nations: Human Development Index 2018 , ranked 57th out of 189 countries
 U.S. Chamber International IP Index 2017, ranked 19th out of 45 countries
 U.S. Chamber International IP Index 2019, ranked 24th out of 50 countries
 UNWTO: Tourism Highlights 2017 Edition, ranked 11th in the world
 U.S. News & World Report Best Countries 2016, ranked 28th out of 60 countries
 U.S. News & World Report Best Countries 2017, ranked 35th out of 80 countries
 U.S. News & World Report Best Countries 2018, ranked 34th out of 80 countries
 U.S. News & World Report Best Countries 2019, ranked 38th out of 80 countries
 U.S. News & World Report Best Countries 2020, ranked 32nd out of 73 countries
 U.S. News & World Report Best Countries To Invest In 2018, ranked 4th out of 80 countries
 U.S. News & World Report Best Countries To Invest In 2019, ranked 13rd out of 29 countries
 U.S. News & World Report Best Countries To Invest In 2020, ranked 12nd out of 25 countries
 World Economic Forum Human Capital Report 2016, ranked 42nd out of 130 countries
 World Economic Forum Human Capital Report 2017, ranked 33rd out of 130 countries
 World Economic Forum Travel & Tourism Competitiveness Index 2007, ranked 31st out of 124 countries
 World Economic Forum Travel & Tourism Competitiveness Index 2008, ranked 32nd out of 130 countries
 World Economic Forum Travel & Tourism Competitiveness Index 2009, ranked 32nd out of 133 countries
 World Economic Forum Travel & Tourism Competitiveness Index 2011, ranked 35th out of 139 countries
 World Economic Forum Travel & Tourism Competitiveness Index 2013, ranked 34th out of 140 countries
 World Economic Forum Travel & Tourism Competitiveness Index 2015, ranked 25th out of 141 countries
 World Economic Forum Travel & Tourism Competitiveness Index 2017, ranked 26th out of 136 countries
 World Economic Forum Travel & Tourism Competitiveness Index 2019, ranked 29th out of 140 countries

Healthcare
 Bloomberg: Covid Resilience Ranking 2021, ranked 51st out of 53 countries
 Bloomberg: Health Care Efficiency Index 2017, ranked 22nd out of 55 countries
 Bloomberg: Health Care Efficiency Index 2018, ranked 29th out of 56 countries
 Economist Intelligence Unit & Johns Hopkins Center for Health Security & Nuclear Threat Initiative: Global Health Security Index 2019, ranked 18th out of 195 countries
 Economist Intelligence Unit & Johns Hopkins Center for Health Security & Nuclear Threat Initiative: Global Health Security Index 2021, ranked 27th out of 195 countries
 Indigo Wellness Index 2019, ranked 1st out of 24 countries
 International Living Global Retirement Index 2017, ranked 21st out of 151 countries
 International Living Global Retirement Index 2019, ranked 1st out of 25 countries
 LetterOne: Global Wellness Index 2019, ranked 22nd out of 150 countries
 Lowy Institute: Covid Performance Index 2021, ranked 17th out of 102 countries
 Nikkei Asia: COVID-19 Recovery Index, January 2022, ranked 13rd out of 122 countries
 PEMANDU Associates: Global COVID-19 Index (GCI) 2022, ranked 13rd out of 180 countries

Military
Economist Intelligence Unit: Global Peace Index 2007, ranked 37th out of 121 countries
Global Firepower: Military Strength Ranking 2017, ranked 33rd out of 133 countries
Global Firepower: Military Strength Ranking 2018, ranked 44th out of 136 countries
Global Firepower: Military Strength Ranking 2020, ranked 44th out of 138 countries
Institute for Economics and Peace: Global Peace Index 2010, ranked 22nd out of 149 countries
Institute for Economics and Peace: Global Peace Index 2011, ranked 19th out of 153 countries
Institute for Economics and Peace: Global Peace Index 2012, ranked 20th out of 158 countries
Institute for Economics and Peace: Global Peace Index 2013, ranked 29th out of 162 countries
Institute for Economics and Peace: Global Peace Index 2014, ranked 33rd out of 162 countries
Institute for Economics and Peace: Global Peace Index 2015, ranked 28th out of 162 countries
Institute for Economics and Peace: Global Peace Index 2016 , ranked 30th out of 163 countries
Institute for Economics and Peace: Global Peace Index 2017 , ranked 29th out of 163 countries
Institute for Economics and Peace: Global Peace Index 2018 , ranked 25th out of 163 countries
Institute for Economics and Peace: Global Peace Index 2019 , ranked 16th out of 163 countries
Institute for Economics and Peace: Global Peace Index 2020, ranked 20th out of 163 countries
Lowy Institute: Asia Power Index 2018, ranked 9th out of 25 Asian countries
Lowy Institute: Asia Power Index 2019, ranked 9th out of 25 Asian countries
Lowy Institute: Asia Power Index 2020, ranked 10th out of 26 Asian countries

Political
Economist Intelligence Unit: Democracy Index 2011, ranked 71st out of 167 countries
Economist Intelligence Unit: Democracy Index 2012, ranked 64th out of 167 countries
Economist Intelligence Unit: Democracy Index 2013 , ranked 64th out of 167 countries
Economist Intelligence Unit: Democracy Index 2014, ranked 65th out of 167 countries
Economist Intelligence Unit: Democracy Index 2015, ranked 68th out of 167 countries
Economist Intelligence Unit: Democracy Index 2016, ranked 65th out of 167 countries
Economist Intelligence Unit: Democracy Index 2017, ranked 59th out of 167 countries
Economist Intelligence Unit: Democracy Index 2018, ranked 52nd out of 167 countries
Economist Intelligence Unit: Democracy Index 2019, ranked 43rd out of 167 countries
Economist Intelligence Unit: Democracy Index 2020, ranked 39th out of 167 countries
Economist Intelligence Unit: Democracy Index 2021, ranked 39th out of 167 countries
Freedom House: Freedom in the World 2010, scored 4 "Partly Free" out of 7
Freedom House: Freedom in the World 2011, scored 4 "Partly Free" out of 7
Freedom House: Freedom in the World 2012, scored 4 "Partly Free" out of 7
Freedom House: Freedom in the World 2013, scored 4 "Partly Free" out of 7
Freedom House: Freedom in the World 2014, scored 4 "Partly Free" out of 7
Freedom House: Freedom in the World 2015, scored 4 "Partly Free" out of 7
Freedom House: Freedom in the World 2016, scored 4 "Partly Free" out of 7
Freedom House: Freedom in the World 2017, scored 4 "Partly Free" out of 7
Freedom House: Freedom in the World 2018, scored 4 "Partly Free" out of 7
Freedom House: Freedom in the World 2019, scored 52 "Partly Free" out of 100
Freedom House: Freedom in the World 2020, scored 52 "Partly Free" out of 100
Freedom House: Freedom in the World 2021, scored 51 "Partly Free" out of 100
Gallup: Global Law and Order 2019, ranked 18th out of 42 score ranking
Gallup: Global Law and Order 2020, ranked 13th out of 41 score ranking
Reporters Without Borders: World Press Freedom Index 2010, ranked 141st out of 178 countries
Reporters Without Borders: World Press Freedom Index 2014, ranked 147th out of 180 countries
Reporters Without Borders: World Press Freedom Index 2015 , ranked 147th out of 180 countries
Reporters Without Borders: World Press Freedom Index 2016 , ranked 146th out of 180 countries
Reporters Without Borders: World Press Freedom Index 2017 , ranked 144th out of 180 countries
Reporters Without Borders: World Press Freedom Index 2018 , ranked 145th out of 180 countries
Reporters Without Borders: World Press Freedom Index 2019, ranked 123rd out of 180 countries
Reporters Without Borders: World Press Freedom Index 2020, ranked 101st out of 180 countries
Reporters Without Borders: World Press Freedom Index 2021, ranked 119th out of 180 countries
TRACE Bribery Risk Matrix 2014 ranked 62nd out of 197 countries
TRACE Bribery Risk Matrix 2016 ranked 47th out of 199 countries
TRACE Bribery Risk Matrix 2017 ranked 79th out of 200 countries
TRACE Bribery Risk Matrix 2018 ranked 63rd out of 200 countries
TRACE Bribery Risk Matrix 2019 ranked 58th out of 200 countries
TRACE Bribery Risk Matrix 2020 ranked 51st out of 194 countries
TRACE Bribery Risk Matrix 2021 ranked 65th out of 194 countries
Transparency International: Corruption Perceptions Index 2006 ranked 43rd out of 163 countries
Transparency International: Corruption Perceptions Index 2007  ranked 43rd out of 179 countries
Transparency International: Corruption Perceptions Index 2008 ranked 47th out of 180 countries
Transparency International: Corruption Perceptions Index 2009 ranked 56th out of 180 countries
Transparency International: Corruption Perceptions Index 2010 ranked 56th out of 178 countries
Transparency International: Corruption Perceptions Index 2011  ranked 60th out of 182 countries
Transparency International: Corruption Perceptions Index 2012 ranked 54th out of 174 countries
Transparency International: Corruption Perceptions Index 2013 ranked 53rd out of 175 countries
Transparency International: Corruption Perceptions Index 2014 ranked 50th out of 174 countries
Transparency International: Corruption Perceptions Index 2015 ranked 54th out of 167 countries
Transparency International: Corruption Perceptions Index 2016 ranked 55th out of 176 countries
Transparency International: Corruption Perceptions Index 2017 ranked 62nd out of 180 countries
Transparency International: Corruption Perceptions Index 2018 ranked 61st out of 180 countries
Transparency International: Corruption Perceptions Index 2019  ranked 51st out of 180 countries
Transparency International: Corruption Perceptions Index 2020 ranked 57th out of 180 countries
Transparency International: Corruption Perceptions Index 2021 ranked 62nd out of 180 countries
World Justice Project: Rule of Law Index 2016, ranked 56th out of 113 countries
World Justice Project: Rule of Law Index 2017, ranked 53rd out of 113 countries
World Justice Project: Rule of Law Index 2019, ranked 51st out of 126 countries
World Justice Project: Rule of Law Index 2020, ranked 47th out of 128 countries
World Justice Project: Rule of Law Index 2021, ranked 54th out of 139 countries

Social
Big Travel: Top 50 Sexiest Accents In The World 2019, ranked 39th in the world
Big Travel: The 50 Sexiest Nationalities In The World 2019, ranked 25th in the world
Economist Intelligence Unit: Quality-of-life index 2005, ranked 36th out of 108 countries
Economist Intelligence Unit: Where-to-be-born Index 1988, ranked 37th out of 80 countries
Economist Intelligence Unit: Where-to-be-born Index 2013, ranked 36th out of 80 countries
Expedia: 17th Annual Survey on Vacation Deprivation 2017, ranked 3rd out of 30 countries
Gallup: Potential Net Migration Index 2014, ranked 4th out of 28 Asian countries
Ipsos: Index of Ignorance 2016, ranked 36th out of 40 countries
Ipsos: Misperceptions Index 2017, ranked 15th out of 38 countries
Ipsos: Misperceptions Index 2018, ranked 4th out of 37 countries
Mercer: Melbourne Mercer Global Pension Index 2018, ranked C rating with an overall score of 58.5
Mercer: Melbourne Mercer Global Pension Index 2019, ranked C+ rating with an overall score of 60.6
Mercer: Melbourne Mercer Global Pension Index 2020, ranked C+ rating with an overall score of 60.1
Mercer: Melbourne Mercer Global Pension Index 2021, ranked 23rd in the world with an overall score of 59.6
Nature: Where People Walk The Most 2017, ranked 44th out of 46 countries
Social Progress Imperative: Social Progress Index 2014, ranked 45th out of 132 countries
Social Progress Imperative: Social Progress Index 2015, ranked 46th out of 133 countries
Social Progress Imperative: Social Progress Index 2016, ranked 50th out of 133 countries
Social Progress Imperative: Social Progress Index 2017, ranked 50th out of 128 countries
The Economist: Global Normalcy Index 2021, ranked 50th out of 50 countries
Sustainable Development Solutions Network's World Happiness Report 2013, ranked 56th out of 156 countries
United Nations Sustainable Development Solutions Network's World Happiness Report 2015, ranked 61st out of 158 countries
United Nations Sustainable Development Solutions Network's World Happiness Report 2016, ranked 47th out of 157 countries
United Nations Sustainable Development Solutions Network's World Happiness Report 2017 , ranked 42nd out of 155 countries
United Nations Sustainable Development Solutions Network's World Happiness Report 2018, ranked 35th out of 156 countries
United Nations Sustainable Development Solutions Network's World Happiness Report 2019, ranked 80th out of 156 countries
United Nations Sustainable Development Solutions Network's World Happiness Report 2020, ranked 82nd out of 153 countries
U.S. News & World Report: Best Heritage Country 2020, ranked 32nd out of 73 countries
U.S. News & World Report: Best Heritage Country 2021, ranked 34th out of 78 countries
World Economic Forum: Global Social Mobility Index 2020, ranked 43rd out of 82 countries

Demographics 

 Birth rate 2011: ranked 82nd out of 221 countries
 Birth rate 2016: ranked 85th out of 226 countries
 Birth rate 2017: ranked 85th out of 226 countries
 Death rate 2011: ranked 186th out of 223 countries
 Death rate 2016: ranked 186th out of 226 countries
 Death rate 2017: ranked 192nd out of 226 countries
 Fertility rate 2011: ranked 76th out of 222 countries
 Fertility rate 2016: ranked 77th out of 224 countries
 Fertility rate 2017: ranked 80th out of 224 countries
 Life expectancy 2011: ranked 111th out of 221 countries
 Life expectancy 2016: ranked 110th out of 224 countries
 Life expectancy 2017: ranked 109th out of 224 countries

Technological
Economist Intelligence Unit: E-readiness 2007, ranked 43rd out of 69 countries
Economist Intelligence Unit: E-readiness 2008, ranked 34th out of 70 countries
Economist Intelligence Unit: E-readiness 2009, ranked 38th out of 70 countries
Economist Intelligence Unit: E-readiness 2010, ranked 36th out of 70 countries
Economist Intelligence Unit: Government E-Payments Adoption 2011, ranked 29th out of 62 countries
Economist Intelligence Unit: Government E-Payments Adoption 2018, ranked 19th out of 73 countries
Huawei: Global Connectivity Index (GCI) 2015, ranked 29th out of 50 countries
Huawei: Global Connectivity Index (GCI) 2016, ranked 25th out of 50 countries
Huawei: Global Connectivity Index (GCI) 2017, ranked 24th out of 50 countries
Huawei: Global Connectivity Index (GCI) 2019, ranked 30th out of 79 countries
Huawei: Global Connectivity Index (GCI) 2020, ranked 34th out of 79 countries
International Telecommunication Union: Global Cybersecurity Index (GCI) 2014, ranked 3rd out of 29 overall index scores
International Telecommunication Union: Global Cybersecurity Index (GCI) 2015, ranked 3rd out of 29 overall index scores
International Telecommunication Union: Global Cybersecurity Index (GCI) 2017, ranked 3rd out of 165 countries
International Telecommunication Union: Global Cybersecurity Index (GCI) 2018, ranked 8th out of 175 countries
International Telecommunication Union: Global Cybersecurity Index (GCI) 2020, ranked 5th out of 194 countries
International Telecommunication Union: ICT Development Index 2010, ranked 61st out of 166 countries
International Telecommunication Union: ICT Development Index 2015, ranked 64th out of 167 countries
International Telecommunication Union: ICT Development Index 2016, ranked 62nd out of 175 countries
International Telecommunication Union: ICT Development Index 2017, ranked 63rd out of 176 countries
MasterCard & Tufts University: Digital Intelligence Index 2020, ranked as Stand Out Nation that digitally advanced and exhibiting high momentum, leaders in driving innovation and building on existing advantages
NationMaster: Technological Achievement 2001, ranked 28th out of 68 countries
Open Knowledge Foundation: Global Open Data Index (GODI) 2018 , ranked 87th out of 94 countries
Opensignal: The State of Mobile Games Experience in the 5G Era 2020, ranked 50th out of 100 countries
Oxford Insights: Government Artificial Intelligence Readiness Index 2019, ranked 22nd out of 194 countries
ScienceDirect: Global Smartphone Addiction Research, ranked 3rd out of 24 countries
Speedtest Global Index 2018: Fixed Broadband, ranked 29th out of 130 countries
Speedtest Global Index 2020: Fixed Broadband, ranked 36th out of 176 countries
Speedtest Global Index 2018: Mobile, ranked 75th out of 124 countries
Speedtest Global Index 2020: Mobile, ranked 86th out of 141 countries
Surfshark: Digital Quality of Life (DQL) Index 2021, ranked 31st out of 110 countries
Tortoise Media: Global AI Index 2019, ranked 40th out of 54 countries
Tortoise Media: Global AI Index 2021, ranked 43rd out of 62 countries
Truecaller Global Spam Report 2021, ranked 32nd in the world
UN: E-Participation Index 2003, ranked 67th out of 151 countries
UN: E-Participation Index 2004, ranked 62nd out of 151 countries
UN: E-Participation Index 2005, ranked 52nd out of 151 countries
UN: E-Participation Index 2008, ranked 41st out of 170 countries
UN: E-Participation Index 2010, ranked 12nd out of 180 countries
UN: E-Participation Index 2012, ranked 31st out of 161 countries
UN: E-Participation Index 2014, ranked 59th out of 192 countries
UN: E-Participation Index 2016, ranked 47th out of 191 countries
UN: E-Participation Index 2018, ranked 32nd out of 193 countries
UN: E-Participation Index 2020, ranked 29th out of 193 countries
UN: E-Government Development Index (EDGI) 2003, ranked 43rd out of 174 countries
UN: E-Government Development Index (EDGI) 2004, ranked 42nd out of 179 countries
UN: E-Government Development Index (EDGI) 2005, ranked 43rd out of 180 countries
UN: E-Government Development Index (EDGI) 2008, ranked 34th out of 183 countries
UN: E-Government Development Index (EDGI) 2010, ranked 32nd out of 184 countries
UN: E-Government Development Index (EDGI) 2012, ranked 40th out of 191 countries
UN: E-Government Development Index (EDGI) 2014, ranked 52nd out of 193 countries
UN: E-Government Development Index (EDGI) 2016, ranked 60th out of 193 countries
UN: E-Government Development Index (EDGI) 2018, ranked 48th out of 193 countries
UN: E-Government Development Index (EDGI) 2020, ranked 47th out of 193 countries
UNCTAD: B2C E-Commerce Index 2016, ranked 44th out of 137 countries
UNCTAD: B2C E-Commerce Index 2017, ranked 38th out of 144 countries
UNCTAD: B2C E-Commerce Index 2018, ranked 34th out of 151 countries
UNCTAD: B2C E-Commerce Index 2019, ranked 34th out of 152 countries
UNCTAD: Technology and Innovation Report Readiness For Frontier Technologies Index 2021, ranked 31st out of 158 countries
World Economic Forum: Global Information Technology Report The Networked Readiness Index 2016, ranked 31st out of 139 countries

See also
Lists of countries
Lists by country
List of international rankings
International rankings of Penang

References

Malaysia